Carmel Evelyn McSharry (18 August 1926 – 4 March 2018) was an Irish character actress, best known for her roles as Beryl Humphries in Beryl's Lot (1973–77), a daytime ITV serial, and as Mrs. Hollingbery in In Sickness and in Health. She also played bit parts in The Day the Earth Caught Fire (1961), 80,000 Suspects (1963) and The Leather Boys (1964).

Other television work includes roles in The Liver Birds, Casualty and Z-Cars. She also appeared in the BBC play Home from Home in 1973, which also featured Yootha Joyce and Michael Robbins.

Personal life
Carmel McSharry's parents, John McSharry and Christina Harvey were Irish. Her mother travelled back to Dublin for the birth of Carmel so that she should be born in the Irish Free State.

McSharry married Derek Briggs in 1949. They had three children, Desna, Theresa (the actress Tessa Bell Briggs) and Sean. The marriage ended in divorce.

Retirement and death
McSharry retired in 1997. She died on 4 March 2018 in London, aged 91.

Selected TV and filmography
Oliver Twist as Nancy (10 episodes, 1962)
80,000 Suspects (1963) as Cleaner
The Leather Boys (1964) as Bus conductor
The Witches (1966) as Mrs. Dowsett
The Man Outside (1967) as Olga
Beryl's Lot as Beryl Humphries (52 episodes, 1973–1977)
Little Lord Fauntleroy (1980) as Mary 
The Liver Birds as Mrs. Boswell/Hennessey (8 episodes, 1975–78, 1996)
Bluebell as Aunt Mary (6 episodes, 1986)
The Ruth Rendell Mysteries as Ruby Branch (4 episodes, 1987)
Wish Me Luck as Annette (4 episodes, 1989)
In Sickness and in Health as Mrs. Hollingbery (27 episodes, 1985–1992)
Goodnight Sweetheart as Phoebe's grandmother (1 episode, 1997: "The Leaving of Liverpool")

References

External links
 

1926 births
2018 deaths
Irish soap opera actresses
Irish television actresses
Actresses from Dublin (city)
Irish emigrants to the United Kingdom
Alumni of RADA